Kitona Air Base  is a military airport located near Kitona in the Democratic Republic of Congo. Up until 2007, it was commanded by Major General Rigobert Massamba Musungu of the DR Congolese Air Force.

Facilities

See also
 Air Force of the Democratic Republic of the Congo

References

External links
 

Airports in Kongo Central Province
Military of the Democratic Republic of the Congo